Tamesguida is a town and commune in Médéa Province, Algeria. According to the 1998 census it has a population of 4964.

Geography
Tamesguida is situated at the bottom of Djebel Mouzaïa (altitude of 1,604m), 10 km north-west of Médéa Province.

References

Communes of Médéa Province
Cities in Algeria
Algeria